Luiz Gustavo Dias (born 23 July 1987) is a Brazilian professional footballer who plays as a defensive midfielder for Saudi Professional League club Al-Nassr. He began his career as a left back, but has played mostly as a defensive midfielder, and also as a centre back.

From 2007 to 2017 he played in Germany, where he represented 1899 Hoffenheim, Bayern Munich and VfL Wolfsburg, making 245 Bundesliga appearances and scoring 15 goals. He won six trophies in his time in the country, including the 2012–13 UEFA Champions League with Bayern Munich.

A full international with over 40 caps since his debut in 2011, Luiz Gustavo represented Brazil as they won the 2013 FIFA Confederations Cup and came fourth at the 2014 FIFA World Cup, both on home soil.

Club career

Early career
Born in Pindamonhangaba, São Paulo, Luiz Gustavo started his professional career at Corinthians Alagoano. In August 2007, he was loaned to German club 1899 Hoffenheim, then of the 2. Bundesliga. On 1 April 2008, Hoffenheim signed Luiz Gustavo on a permanent contract. He went on to play two and a half Bundesliga seasons for the club.

Bayern Munich
On 3 January 2011, Luiz Gustavo was signed by Bayern Munich. The amount of the transfer fee varies from €15–20 million, depending on different sources.
Twelve days later, he made his debut for the Bavarian club, coming on as a second-half substitute in the 1–1 away draw with VfL Wolfsburg. He scored his first goal for the club on 26 February, the equaliser in the 1–3 home loss against Borussia Dortmund, by volleying in Franck Ribéry's cross.

In his first full season at Bayern, he played 46 matches in total, with Bayern finishing runner-up in all three competitions which they contested. His only goal came on 13 August, an added-time strike which won a league match away to VfL Wolfsburg. On 12 May 2012, Luiz Gustavo was selected to start in the centre of midfield in the DFB-Pokal Final, but he was substituted at half-time for Thomas Müller as Bayern were beaten 5–2 by Dortmund. He missed their defeat a week later in the Champions League final, as he was booked in the second leg of their semi-final victory over Real Madrid.

Luiz Gustavo began the 2012–13 season by featuring in Bayern's 2–1 win over Borussia Dortmund in the DFL-Supercup on 12 August. He scored four times in 22 matches as they won the league title. On 25 May 2013, Luiz Gustavo appeared as an added-time substitute for Franck Ribéry as Bayern defeated Borussia Dortmund 2–1 in the Champions League final at Wembley Stadium.

VfL Wolfsburg
On 16 August 2013, it was reported that Luiz Gustavo had signed for VfL Wolfsburg for an unspecified amount, on a contract that would tie him to the club till 2018. He made his debut the following day, starting in a 4–0 win over Schalke 04 at the Volkswagen Arena. One week later, in his next appearance, he was sent off for two bookings as his team lost 0–2 at Mainz 05, and he was also dismissed on his return on 14 September in a 1–3 defeat at Bayer Leverkusen. He scored 4 goals in 29 matches as Wolfsburg came fifth to qualify automatically for the group stage of the next season's UEFA Europa League, receiving a third red card on 19 April 2014 in a 3–1 win at rivals Hamburger SV.

Luiz Gustavo scored four times in five matches as Wolfsburg won the DFB-Pokal in his second season, starting with a brace in a 4–1 win over 1. FC Heidenheim in the second round on 29 October 2014, and continuing with a goal in their 4–0 victory at Arminia Bielefeld in the semi-final on 29 April 2015. On 30 May, he scored from a rebounded shot by compatriot Naldo to equalise in the  final against Borussia Dortmund, with Wolfsburg eventually winning 3–1 for their first cup honour.

On 29 April 2017 Luiz Gustavo was sent off for the eighth time in his career in a 6–0 defeat to his former club Bayern Munich, in doing so becoming tied with Jens Nowotny for the most red cards in Bundesliga history. Referee Felix Zwayer sent Gustavo off in the 78 minute after he picking up a second yellow card for fouling Renato Sanches. Gustavo had to be restrained by his teammates as he sarcastically applauded the referee and refused to leave the field.

Olympique de Marseille

On 4 July 2017, Luiz Gustavo ended his decade-long spell in German football, signing for France's Olympique de Marseille for a fee of €8 million. He agreed a four-year deal with a club record monthly salary of €750,000. He made his debut 23 days later in a 4–2 home win over Belgium's KV Oostende in the third round of Europa League qualification.

He made his Ligue 1 debut on 6 August, starting in a 3–0 home win over Dijon in the first game of the new season, contributing to the first goal from Clinton N'Jie. On 1 October, he scored his first goal to conclude a 4–2 win at Nice, but was later sent off for a shin-high-challenge on Pierre Lees-Melou. On his return three weeks later, he scored again from 30 yards to open the scoring in a 2–2 draw with rivals Paris Saint-Germain in Le Classique, again at the Stade Vélodrome.

Luiz Gustavo was an ever-present in the 2017–18 UEFA Europa League, playing all of Marseille's 19 matches as they reached the final, losing 3–0 to Atlético Madrid in Lyon. He made 56 official appearances in his first season in France, making him the most selected player by manager Rudi Garcia that year. He was named in the Ligue 1 team of the year at the Trophées UNFP du football.

Fenerbahçe
On 2 September 2019, Luiz Gustavo signed a four-year deal with Turkish club Fenerbahçe. He made his debut on 16 September in a 3–1 away loss against Alanyaspor. He scored his first goal for the club on 26 October, in a 5–1 home win over Konyaspor.

In his first season at Fenerbahçe, he played 32 matches and scored 3 goals with 1 assist in total. In his second season, he was named one of Fenerbahçe's vice-captains. On 18 October 2020, he captained Fenerbahçe for the first time in a 3–2 away win over Göztepe. Gustavo scored his first goal of the season in Fenerbahçe's 4–1 home win over İstanbul Başakşehir on 23 December.

Al-Nassr
On 24 July 2022, Luiz Gustavo joined Saudi Arabian club Al-Nassr on a one-year contract, reuniting with former manager Rudi Garcia.

International career

Luiz Gustavo made his debut for Brazil on 10 August 2011, coming on as a second-half substitute in a friendly match against Germany.

He was a member of Luiz Felipe Scolari's 23-man squad for the 2013 FIFA Confederations Cup on home soil, and played the full 90 minutes as Brazil defeated world champions Spain 3–0 in the final at the Estádio do Maracanã on 30 June. He scored his first goal for Brazil in a friendly match against Australia on 7 September, later that year.

During the 2014 FIFA World Cup on home soil, and having played every minute up to that point, he was suspended for the quarter-final match against Colombia due to accumulation of yellow cards. He returned to the starting eleven for the next two games as the team finished fourth.

Luiz Gustavo was initially called into Dunga's squad for the 2015 Copa América in Chile, but withdrew with a knee injury which required surgery, and was replaced by Fred.

Personal life
Luiz Gustavo is a devout Catholic, commenting that he "read[s] the Bible a lot and pray[s] twice a day". He became engaged to his girlfriend Milene on 25 December 2010, while on holiday in Brazil. He cites his mother as a big source of inspiration for him because of her dream that he would one day succeed as a player, before her death when he was just 16 years old.

Career statistics

Club

International

Scores and results list Brazil's goal tally first.

Honours

Club
Bayern Munich
 Bundesliga: 2012–13
 DFB-Pokal: 2012–13
 DFL-Supercup: 2012
 UEFA Champions League: 2012–13

VfL Wolfsburg
 DFB-Pokal: 2014–15
 DFL-Supercup: 2015

Marseille
 UEFA Europa League runner-up: 2017–18

International
Brazil
FIFA Confederations Cup: 2013

Individual
UEFA Europa League Squad of the Season: 2017–18
Ligue 1 Team of the Year: 2017–18
 Saudi Professional League Player of the Month: October 2022'''

References

External links

 

1987 births
Living people
People from Pindamonhangaba
Association football midfielders
Brazilian footballers
Brazilian expatriate footballers
Sport Club Corinthians Alagoano players
Clube de Regatas Brasil players
TSG 1899 Hoffenheim players
FC Bayern Munich footballers
VfL Wolfsburg players
Olympique de Marseille players
Fenerbahçe S.K. footballers
Al Nassr FC players
Expatriate footballers in Germany
Expatriate footballers in France
Expatriate footballers in Turkey
Expatriate footballers in Saudi Arabia
Brazilian expatriate sportspeople in Germany
Brazilian expatriate sportspeople in France
Brazilian expatriate sportspeople in Turkey
Brazilian expatriate sportspeople in Saudi Arabia
Bundesliga players
2. Bundesliga players
Ligue 1 players
Süper Lig players
Saudi Professional League players
Brazilian Roman Catholics
Brazil international footballers
2013 FIFA Confederations Cup players
2014 FIFA World Cup players
FIFA Confederations Cup-winning players
UEFA Champions League winning players
Footballers from São Paulo (state)